Christopher Bowen (born 20 October 1959) is a British actor.

Bowen was educated at the Cathedral School, Llandaff, Radley College, and Magdalene College, Cambridge University. He trained at the Old Vic Theatre School in Bristol and spent three years with the RSC in the 1980s. Other theatre credits include the title role in "Macbeth" at the Southwark Playhouse, Laertes in "Hamlet" at the Young Vic, Veit Kunz in "Franziska" at the Gate Theatre, Oberon in "A Midsummer Night's Dream" for the City of London Festival, Maecenas in "Antony and Cleopatra" at the Haymarket Theatre.

His television credits include: Mr Briggs in "Jane Eyre" for the BBC, Alastair Campbell in "Why We Went to War" for C4, Ant Johnson in "Holby City", Richard Carey in "Murder in Mesopotamia" (Poirot), Dempsey and Makepeace, Knights of God, John Dexter in Tanamera – Lion of Singapore, Mordred in the Doctor Who serial "Battlefield", Little Lord Fauntleroy, Waiting for God, Castles, Peak Practice, Heartbeat, Doctors, Rosemary & Thyme and the title role in an unaired pilot of Darkman.

His film credits include: Commander Day in the James Bond film Tomorrow Never Dies, Charles Fairford in Cold Comfort Farm directed by John Schlesinger, the Prince of Wales in Richard III, Hamilton in Gaudi Afternoon directed by Susan Seidelman.

Filmography

References

External links
 Christopher Bowen website
 

1959 births
Living people
People educated at Radley College
Alumni of Magdalene College, Cambridge
British male film actors
Place of birth missing (living people)
British male television actors